The Bodell River is a river in northern Cochrane District in Northeastern Ontario, Canada. It is part of the James Bay drainage basin, and is a left tributary of the Kesagami River.

The river begins at Bodell Lake and heads north. It turns northeast, takes in the right tributary Black River and left tributary Pesekanaskoskau River, and reaches its mouth at the Kesagami River. The Kesagami River flows via the Harricana River to James Bay.

See also
List of rivers of Ontario

References

Sources

Rivers of Cochrane District